Napuka, or Pukaroa, is a small coral atoll in the Disappointment Islands, in the northeastern part of the Tuamotu Archipelago in French Polynesia. It is located only 15 km to the southeast of Tepoto Nord, its nearest neighbor, forming a small group. These two atolls are quite isolated, the nearest land being Fangatau Atoll 170 km to the south.

Napuka Atoll is 10.5 km long and about 4 km wide. Its reef is quite broad, completely enclosing the lagoon. The total dry land area of the thirty islands on Napuka's reef is 8 km2. The surface of the lagoon is 18 km2.

Napuka has 234 inhabitants according to the 2017 census. The main village is Tepukamaruia (Te Puka Maru Ia).

History
The first recorded European to reach Napuka Atoll was the British explorer John Byron, in 1765. He named Napuka and Tepoto "Disappointment Islands" because he found the natives to be of a hostile disposition toward him.

Napuka was visited by the historic United States Exploring Expedition, on 23 Aug. 1839. This atoll was probably the one that Charles Wilkes called "Wytoohee" or "Wutoohee".

The airport on Napuka opened in 1977.

Administration
The commune of Napuka consists of the atolls of Napuka and Tepoto Nord.

References

Atoll names
Origin of the name (in German)
United States Exploring Expedition, - Charles Wilkes
Napuka airport

External links

Atoll list (in French)
A journey to the Disappointment Islands

Communes of French Polynesia
Atolls of the Tuamotus